Mason Tyler Musso (born March 17, 1989) is an American musician, singer and songwriter, best known for being the lead vocalist of Metro Station. He is the older brother of actor Mitchel Musso of Hannah Montana fame.

Early life 
Mason Tyler Musso was born to Katherine (née Moore) and Samuel Musso in Dallas, Texas, on March 17, 1989. Soon after, his family moved to Rockwall, Texas. He has two younger brothers, Mitchel and Marc, who are both actors. In 2006, Mitchel landed the role of Oliver Oken on the Disney Channel children's comedy series Hannah Montana, causing the Musso family to move to Burbank, California. Musso attended College of the Canyons studying music business classes in 2006.

Career

Beginnings and Metro Station: 2006–2010 

Mason Musso met Trace Cyrus, the older brother of actress and musician Miley Cyrus, on the set of Miley's television show, Hannah Montana. Soon afterward, the two formed the band Metro Station with Blake Healy and Anthony Improgo. The group released songs on Myspace and soon signed a record deal with Columbia/Red Ink. The band released their debut album Metro Station on September 18, 2007, and peaked at number 39 on Billboard 200 and has been certified gold in Canada. This album included the single "Shake It", which peaked at #10 on the Billboard Hot 100. Internationally, it charted in the top ten in eight countries outside the United States (#2 in Australia, #4 in Canada and the Republic of Ireland, #6 in the United Kingdom, #8 in Japan and #9 in Austria, Germany and New Zealand). The single was certified Gold by the RIAA on June 13, 2008, and later Platinum that year, finally reaching Double Platinum status at the end of January 2009. In December 2007 they released their fourth single "Seventeen Forever" from the album. It is their second song to hit the Billboard Hot 100 at number 42 and has been certified gold.

Breakup and solo project: 2010–2011 
The band went on and recorded a song for the feature-length film Alice in Wonderland, titled "Where's My Angel". In March 2010, after a number of personal disputes between Musso and Cyrus the band went into indefinite hiatus. Metro Station officially disbanded when it was announced both Musso and Cyrus were working on solo projects.

Return of Metro Station: 2011–2017, 2019–2020 
On May 31, 2011, Musso released a track "Ain't So High" on YouTube after acquiring the rights to the Metro Station name. On July 20, 2011, Musso announced he was working on a new Metro Station record with help from former members Blake Healy and Anthony Improgo. On September 25, 2011, Musso released a second song, "Closer and Closer" on SoundCloud and YouTube with Blake Healy.

On August 13, 2014, Cyrus returned to the band. On June 30, 2015, the band released their second album, Savior. They disbanded once again in 2017 but reunited again in 2019, and released the single "I Hate Society" in 2020.

In 2015, Musso was featured in a song with rapper B.LaY titled "It Comes From You".

Social Order: 2020–present 
In 2020, Musso worked with Louis Vecchio, Matthew Di Panni and Anthony Improgo to start a new project under the name "Social Order". Musso spoke in an interview with Alternative Press on why the project started. He stated, "The whole quarantine has definitely got me wanting to write more, try new projects and experiment with different stuff that I wouldn't normally do." Their debut single "Going Outside Dancing" was released that same year. The group released an EP titled, How to Lie in 2022.

Discography 
Metro Station

 Metro Station (2007)
 Savior (2015)

Social Order
 How to Lie (2022)

Other appearances

References

External links 

1989 births
Living people
People from Garland, Texas
American pop rock singers
American people of Italian descent
People from Rockwall, Texas
21st-century American singers